Carl Wilhelm Kruckenberg (October 27, 1881 – November 7, 1940) was a Swedish Army officer and horse rider who competed in the 1912 Summer Olympics.

He finished eighth in the Individual dressage competition with his horse Kartusch.

Kruckenberg was ryttmästare in the Swedish Army.

References

1881 births
1940 deaths
Swedish Army officers
Swedish dressage riders
Olympic equestrians of Sweden
Swedish male equestrians
Equestrians at the 1912 Summer Olympics